Reginald Bretnor (born Alfred Reginald Kahn; July 30, 1911 – July 22, 1992) was an American science fiction author who flourished between the 1950s and 1980s. Most of his fiction was in short story form, and usually featured a whimsical story line or ironic plot twist. He also wrote on military theory and public affairs, and edited some of the earliest books to consider SF from a literary theory and criticism perspective.

Bretnor's father, Grigory Kahn, was born in Russia, but he and his family left Siberia for Japan in 1917 and later settled in the United States. Bretnor's mother was born a British subject, became a Russian subject, spent from 1917 to 1920 in Japan, then settled in the United States with her children Reginald and Margaret. Reginald Bretnor himself was born in Vladivostok, Russia.  He was married to Helen Harding, a translator and U.C. Berkeley librarian, from 1948 until her death in 1967. He subsequently married Rosalie, whom he referred to in a letter in the Southern Oregon Historical Society Archives as Rosalie McShane, although she wrote under the name Rosalie Bodrero.

According to papers in the SOHS Archives, Bretnor's military background included service in the last cavalry unit in the U.S. Army. Health issues led to his discharge in August 1941. He tried to reenlist in 1942, but was rejected. He was hired by the Office of War Information to write propaganda to be sent to Japan, and papers related to his work are held in the SOHS Archives. After World War II, Bretnor worked for the U.S. State Department until ill health once again caused him to resign.  He died, aged 80, in Medford, Oregon.
 
In addition to wars, weaponry and science fiction, Bretnor's interests included cats. He translated Les Chats, the first known book about cats, written by Augustin Paradis de Moncrif in 1727. He also wrote multiple articles about cats, always owned cats, and considered himself to have a psychic connection to cats.

It has been alleged that Bretnor was an early associate of Anton Szandor LaVey in the days before the founding of the Church of Satan, and that Bretnor and other science fiction authors were members of LaVey's "Order of the Trapezoid" in the early 1950s.

Bibliography

 Maybe Just A Little One (short story, 1947)
 A Killing in Swords (1978)
 The Doorstep, first published in Astounding and later in The Year's Greatest Science Fiction and Fantasy.
 The Man On Top
 Cat
 Genius of the Species
 The Past and Its Dead People
 Old Uncle Tom Cobleigh and All
 The Proud Foot of the Conqueror
 Unknown Things
 The Timeless Tales of Reginald Bretnor (posthumous collection of 15 short stories)

Papa Schimmelhorn series

 The Gnurrs Come from the Voodvork Out (short story, 1950)
 Little Anton (novelette, 1951)
 Papa Schimmelhorn and the S.O.D.O.M. Serum (1973)
 Count Von Schimmelhorn and the Time-Pony (novella, 1974)
 The Ladies of Beetlegoose Nine (novella, 1976)
 Papa Schimmelhorn's Yang (novelette, 1978)
 The Schimmelhorn File: Memoirs of a Dirty Old Genius (collection, 1979)
 Schimmelhorn's Gold (novel, 1986)
 Nobelist Schimmelhorn (novelette, 1987)

Anthologies

 The Future at War I: Thor's Hammer (1979, editor)
 The Future at War II: The Spear of Mars (1980, editor)
 The Future at War III: Orion's Sword (1980, editor)

Ferdinand Feghoot series

Under the pseudonym Grendel Briarton (an anagram of Reginald Bretnor), he published a series of over eighty science-fiction themed shaggy-dog  vignettes featuring the time-traveling hero Ferdinand Feghoot.  Known as "Feghoots", the stories involved Feghoot resolving a situation encountered while traveling through time and space (à la Doctor Who) with a bad pun.  In one example, he explained his inability to pay his dues for a Sherlock Holmes fan society by turning out his empty pockets and declaring "share lack". In his adventures, Feghoot worked for the Society for the Aesthetic Re-Arrangement of History and traveled via a device that had no name but was typographically represented as the ")(".  In 1980, The Compleat Feghoot collected all of Bretnor's Feghoots published up to  that time and included a selection of winners and honorable mentions from a contest run by The Magazine of Fantasy & Science Fiction. The book is, as of 2006, out of print and very rare.

Non-fiction

Reginald Bretnor invited leading SF authors and science writers to participate in virtual "symposiums" by contributing essays (to fill Bretnor's own table of contents) discussing the science fiction genre.

 Science Fiction Today and Tomorrow: A Discursive Symposium (1975, with Frederik Pohl, Poul Anderson, Jack Williamson, Ray Bradbury, Hal Clement, Isaac Asimov, Frank Herbert, Hugo Gernsback, Theodore Sturgeon, A. E. van Vogt, Cory Panshin, Larry Niven, James Blish, Harlan Ellison, E. E. Smith)
 The Craft of Science Fiction: A Symposium on Writing Science Fiction and Science Fantasy (1976, with Robert A. Heinlein, Frederik Pohl, Larry Niven, Poul Anderson, Harlan Ellison, Hal Clement, A. E. van Vogt, Frank Herbert, Jerry Pournelle, Isaac Asimov, Jack Williamson, Norman Spinrad)
 Modern Science Fiction: Its Meaning and Its Future (1953, second edition 1979, with John W. Campbell, Jr., Anthony Boucher, Fletcher Pratt, L. Sprague de Camp, Isaac Asimov, Arthur C. Clarke, Philip Wylie, Gerald Heard)

In 1969, Bretnor published a book on warfare titled Decisive Warfare: A Study in Military Theory.  Largely unnoticed by his science fiction readership but hinted at by his Future at War series, it proved him a scholar of varied talents.

The collection Of Force and Violence and Other Imponderables: Essays on War, Politics, and Government was published in 1992.

Bretnor also wrote nonfiction articles for the survivalist newsletter P.S. Letter, edited by Mel Tappan.

See also
Retreat (survivalism)
Survivalism
Mel Tappan

References

External links
 Ferdinand Feghoot series in The Magazine of Fantasy & Science Fiction
 Schimmelhorn series in The Magazine of Fantasy & Science Fiction
 AuthorWars.com Bibliography
 Biographical introduction  to The Timeless Tales of Reginald Bretnor
 Biographical remembrance of Reginald Bretnor  by Poul Anderson
 Bretnor Archives Virtual Exhibit by the Southern Oregon Historical Society
 
 Reginald Bretnor's online fiction at Free Speculative Fiction Online
 

1911 births
1992 deaths
20th-century American novelists
20th-century American male writers
American male novelists
American science fiction writers
Writers from Vladivostok
American male short story writers
20th-century American short story writers
People of the United States Office of War Information
Emigrants from the Russian Empire to the United States